Lalawélé Atakora (also known as Atakora Lalawélé; born 9 November 1990) is a Togolese footballer who plays for Syrianska FC as a winger.

Career

Club career 
On 20 June 2017, Lalawélé signed with Adana Demirspor.

On 3 July 2018, Gabala FK announced the signing of Lalawélé on a one-year contract, with Gabala confirmed his release at the end of his contract on 4 June 2019. On 20 August 2019 it was confirmed, that Lalawélé had joined Kuwaiti club Kazma SC in the Kuwait Premier League. After a spell in Togolese ASKO Kara, he joined the Swedish fourth-tier club Syrianska in 2021.

Career statistics

Club

International

Statistics accurate as of match played 18 November 2019

International goals
Scores and results list Togo's goal tally first.

Honours
Gabala
 Azerbaijan Cup: 2018–19

References

External links

Guardian Football
TFF Profile
 

1990 births
Living people
Togolese footballers
Togo youth international footballers
Togo international footballers
Association football midfielders
Eliteserien players
Norwegian First Division players
Allsvenskan players
Ettan Fotboll players
TFF First League players
Azerbaijan Premier League players
Fredrikstad FK players
IFK Värnamo players
AIK Fotboll players
Balıkesirspor footballers
Gabala FC players
Kazma SC players
ASKO Kara players
Syrianska FC players
2017 Africa Cup of Nations players
Togolese expatriate footballers
Togolese expatriate sportspeople in Norway
Togolese expatriate sportspeople in Sweden
Togolese expatriate sportspeople in Turkey
Togolese expatriate sportspeople in Azerbaijan
Togolese expatriate sportspeople in Kuwait
Expatriate footballers in Norway
Expatriate footballers in Sweden
Expatriate footballers in Turkey
Expatriate footballers in Azerbaijan
Expatriate footballers in Kuwait
Kuwait Premier League players
21st-century Togolese people